Bray-en-Val is a former commune in the Loiret department in north-central France. On 1 January 2017, it was merged into the new commune Bray-Saint Aignan.

Population

See also
Communes of the Loiret department

References

External links

Official site

Former communes of Loiret